North Cestrian School, formerly North Cestrian Grammar School, is a free school in Altrincham, Greater Manchester, England, for pupils aged between 11 and 16.  North Cestrian is part of the Hamblin Educational Trust.

History 
The school was opened in 1951 by Walter Hamblin, formerly headmaster of Altrincham Grammar School for Boys, with 26 pupils. In 2004, the library was named after him.

The school was originally to be named North Cheshire Grammar School, but this was not permitted by the county education authorities as the school was not government-owned. Hamblin therefore replaced "Cheshire" with its Latinised form "Cestrian"; this maintained the same "NCGS" initials already in place on some school equipment.

The school was originally an all-boys school but in September 2006 admitted its first girls into the sixth form.  In 2008, it became fully co-educational.

Staff
In 2008, teacher David Bradley was awarded an MBA in the Queen's New Year Honours List for services to young people.
Bradley retired in 2013 after an investigation into sexual misconduct recommended he be issued with a Prohibition Order.

Notable former pupils

Devante Cole: English footballer
 Ian Crawford (astrobiologist) 
Francis French: author and noted space historian
Ezekiel Fryers: English footballer
Kevin Godley: musician with 10cc; their song "I Wanna Rule The World", from the 1976 How Dare You! album and co-written by Godley, prominently features the school motto
Kenji Gorré: Dutch footballer
Nicholas (Nicky) Slater: ice dancer
Fred Talbot: weather presenter

References

External links 
School website

Educational institutions established in 1951
Secondary schools in Trafford

1951 establishments in England
Altrincham
Free schools in England